The discography of Kyle, an American rapper and singer, consists of three studio albums, seven mixtapes and sixteen singles. In the early days of his career, he also released non-commercial mixtapes Senior Year (2010), Second Semester (2011), FxL (2011), Super Duper (2011) and K.i.D (2012) exclusively on Bandcamp under the moniker K.i.D.

Studio albums

Commercial mixtapes

Mixtapes

Singles

As lead artist

As featured artist

Promotional singles

Guest appearances

Notes

References

Hip hop discographies
Discographies of American artists
Discography